Italienne was a 40-gun Consolante-class frigate of the French Navy, built by engineer Denais after plans designed by Sané and revised by François Pestel. Under Commander Jurien de La Gravière, she took part in the Battle of Les Sables-d'Olonne, where she sustained very severe damage.

Career 
Ordered on 14 February 1803 as Sultane, the ship was started in March of the same year.

Italienne was commissioned in Saint-Servan on 11 September 1806.

The French put the crews on Sofia, Delaney, master, of and for New York, which brought them into Plymouth on 26 March. Sofia had been coming from Belfast.

In 1809, under Commodore Jurien de La Gravière, she was the flagship of a three-frigate squadron, along with  Calypso and Cybèle. In the ensuing Battle of Les Sables-d'Olonne, Italienne sustained extensive damage and was beached, but managed to take shelter in Les Sables-d'Olonne harbour.

Unable to effect heavy repairs, Italienne remained stranded in Les Sables-d'Olonne harbour in her battered state. The Ministry intended to send her to Nantes for repairs, but this was never effected. Italienne  was struck from the Navy lists in November 1813. In 1816, she was sold as a merchantman.

Notes

Citations and references
Citations

References
 

1806 ships
Ships built in France
Consolante-class frigates
Maritime incidents in 1809
Shipwrecks in the Bay of Biscay